The men's 1500 metre freestyle event at the 2004 Olympic Games was contested at the Olympic Aquatic Centre of the Athens Olympic Sports Complex in Athens, Greece on August 20 and 21.

Australian swimmer and world record holder Grant Hackett became the third swimmer in history to defend the title in this event, breaking an Olympic record time of 14:43.40. U.S. swimmer Larsen Jensen set an American record time of 14:45.29 to take the silver. Great Britain's David Davies, on the other hand, fought off a challenge from Russia's Yuri Prilukov in the final lap to earn a bronze medal by a 7-second margin, with a national record of 14:45.95.

Records
Prior to this competition, the existing world and Olympic records were as follows:

The following records were established during the competition:

Results

Heats

Final

References

External links
Official Olympic Report

M
Men's events at the 2004 Summer Olympics